Xınalı (also, Xınallı and ) is a village and municipality in the Goranboy Rayon of Azerbaijan.  It has a population of 865.

References 

Populated places in Goranboy District